Geoffrey Lloyd Shipton (born 4 June 1941) is an Australian former sprint freestyle swimmer of the 1950s and 1960s, who won a silver medal in the 4×100-metre medley relay at the 1960 Summer Olympics in Rome.

The New South Welshman combined with David Theile, Neville Hayes and Terry Gathercole to win silver in the 4×100-metre medley relay, behind the United States and in front of Japanese team by just 0.2 of a second, the first time this event had been contested at the Olympics.  Shipton had previously won a bronze medal in the 110-yard freestyle at the 1958 British Empire and Commonwealth Games in Cardiff, Wales, behind fellow Australians John Devitt and Gary Chapman.

See also
 List of Commonwealth Games medallists in swimming (men)
 List of Olympic medalists in swimming (men)
 World record progression 4 × 100 metres freestyle relay

References
 

1941 births
Living people
Australian male freestyle swimmers
Olympic silver medalists for Australia
Olympic swimmers of Australia
People from New South Wales
Swimmers at the 1960 Summer Olympics
World record setters in swimming
Medalists at the 1960 Summer Olympics
Olympic silver medalists in swimming
Commonwealth Games medallists in swimming
Commonwealth Games bronze medallists for Australia
Swimmers at the 1958 British Empire and Commonwealth Games
Medallists at the 1958 British Empire and Commonwealth Games